Oğuzhan Aydoğan (born 4 February 1997) is a German professional footballer who plays as a midfielder for TFF 2. Lig side Menemen.

Club career
On 12 November 2020, Aydoğan signed for Alemannia Aachen having previously left Beşiktaş during the summer of 2020.

References

1997 births
German people of Turkish descent
People from Marl, North Rhine-Westphalia
Sportspeople from Münster (region)
Footballers from North Rhine-Westphalia
Living people
German footballers
Germany youth international footballers
Association football midfielders
TSV Marl-Hüls players
Beşiktaş J.K. footballers
Karlsruher SC players
Alemannia Aachen players
Ankaraspor footballers
Menemenspor footballers
3. Liga players
Oberliga (football) players
Regionalliga players
TFF First League players
TFF Second League players
German expatriate footballers
German expatriate sportspeople in Turkey
Expatriate footballers in Turkey